Mehdi Makhloufi (born 14 October 1978 in Roubaix, France) is a French-Algerian footballer. He currently plays as a midfielder for KMSK Deinze in the Belgian Second Division.

References

1978 births
Algerian footballers
French footballers
French sportspeople of Algerian descent
Expatriate footballers in Belgium
Lille OSC players
K.S.K. Beveren players
Cercle Brugge K.S.V. players
K.V. Kortrijk players
CS Grevenmacher players
Pau FC players
Living people
C.S. Visé players
Algerian expatriates in Belgium
K.M.S.K. Deinze players
Association football midfielders